This article details the Catalans Dragons rugby league football club's 2009 season. This is their 4th season in the Super League.

Table

Milestones

Round 1: Steven Bell, Shane Perry and Jason Ryles made their debuts for the Dragons.
Round 1: Rémi Casty made his 50th appearance for the Dragons.
Round 2: Thomas Bosc reached 500 points for the Dragons.
Round 2: Thomas Bosc kicked his 200th goal for the Dragons.
Round 4: Greg Bird made his debut for the Dragons.
Round 4: Jason Croker made his 50th appearance for the Dragons.
Round 6: David Ferriol made his 50th appearance for the Dragons.
Round 6: Greg Bird scored his 1st try for the Dragons.
Round 7: Casey McGuire made his 50th appearance for the Dragons.
Round 7: Steven Bell scored his 1st try for the Dragons.
Round 9: Jason Ryles scored his 1st try for the Dragons.
Round 10: Greg Bird kicked his 1st goal for the Dragons.
Round 11: Dimitri Pelo made his 50th appearance for the Dragons.
Round 11: Grégory Mounis kicked his 1st goal for the Dragons.
Round 14: Jérôme Guisset made his 100th appearance for the Dragons.
Round 14: Julien Touxagas made his 50th appearance for the Dragons.
Round 14: Shane Perry scored his 1st try for the Dragons.
Round 14: Thomas Bosc reached 600 points for the Dragons.
Round 18: Dimitri Pelo scored his 25th try and reached 100 points for the Dragons.
Round 19: Jean-Philippe Baile scored his 1st hat-trick for the Dragons.
Round 20: Cyrille Gossard made his 50th appearance for the Dragons.
Round 21: Grégory Mounis made his 100th appearance for the Dragons.
Round 24: Sébastien Raguin made his 50th appearance for the Dragons.
Round 24: Olivier Elima scored his 1st hat-trick for the Dragons.
Round 26: Casey McGuire kicked his 1st goal for the Dragons.
Round 27: Olivier Elima scored his 25th try and reached 100 points for the Dragons.
PSF: Dane Carlaw made his 50th appearance for the Dragons.
QSF: Adam Mogg scored his 25th try and reached 100 points for the Dragons.
QSF: Vincent Duport scored his 1st hat-trick for the Dragons.

Fixtures and results

2009 Super League

Super League Play-offs

Player appearances
Super League only

 = Injured

 = Suspended

Challenge Cup

Player appearances
Challenge Cup games only

Squad statistics

 Appearances and Points include (Super League, Challenge Cup and play-offs) as of 2 October 2009.

Transfers

In

Out

References

2009 in rugby league by club
2009 in English rugby league
Catalans Dragons seasons